Adrian Brian (March 16, 1892 – September 8, 1978) was an American wrestler. He competed in the Greco-Roman featherweight event at the 1920 Summer Olympics.

References

External links
 

1892 births
1978 deaths
Olympic wrestlers of the United States
Wrestlers at the 1920 Summer Olympics
American male sport wrestlers
People from Columbus, Nebraska
Sportspeople from Nebraska